The Vira people or Bavira (in the plural) are one of the most numerous ethnic groups in the Eastern Democratic Republic of the Congo. These people are located in the region of Uvira in the East of the country, on the northeast coast of Lake Tanganyika at the border with Burundi. The Bavira are also known in the name of Benembuga in Kivira (Bavira language) which means "authentic Uvira citizens."

The current king of the Bavira is Lwegeleza III (Edmond). He succeeded his father Mwami Lenghe Rugaza, who was assassinated in 1997 in the violent disorder which took place after the liberation of the DRC by Laurent-Désiré Kabila.

Cultural identity
To be a Muvira (the singular of Bavira), one must belong by birth to one of the fifty families (clans) founder of the ethnic group. No other consideration is valid in this traditional society. And as Bavira are patriarchal, the lineage of the father determines membership in the group.

Anyone whose family, to say the clan is part of many of these clans is Muvira, regardless of where they live now. And anyone whose clan is not this number of clans is not a Muvira whatever number of years that his family lives in the chiefdom of Bavira. The list of 51 clans that make up the people Bavira is just below.

Kings Bavira

Since 1645 years, are led by the Bavira Dynasty BeneLenghe. These last are from the last king of the dynasty of ancient Balabwe strain, Mbuti Ilunga, who died in Katanga in 1645. His son Lenghe Ilungha took control of the state. Thus, the term BeneLenghe means the descendants of Lenghe. It is from him that we began counting the kings of Bavira.
  Lenghe  or  Lenghe I Ilunga, son of Mbuti Ilunga and first king of the dynasty BeneLenghe (1645-1670), a 25 -year reign
  Mubila  Munanila or Munana son of Ilunga Lenghe I (1671-1709), 38 -year reign
  Kibwe  Mabingo (1709-1735), a 26 -year reign
  Muluta I Kibwe (1735-1763), a 28 -year reign
  Kinyunda  Kye Lugongo (1763-1798), 35 years of reign
  Mbuti II  Lenge (1798-1830), 32 -year reign
  Muluta II  Muvuluma (1830-1871), 41 -year reign
  Nambuza  Mukangwa (1871-1897), a 26 -year reign
  Muluta III  Nakumika (1898-1932), a 34 -year reign
  Lenghe II  Kabale Mamboto Lwegeleza (1932-1945), a 13 -year reign
  Lwegeleza I Kabale Mamboto (1945-1964), 19 -year reign
  Lenghe III  Kabale Rugaza Rampan Roman Geslin (1965-1996), 31 -year reign
  Lwegeleza III  Lenghe Edmond (1997–present)

Clans of Bavira

  Baanza  village Kasenga
  Babenga  village Kigongo
  Babinda  village Kigongo
  Babogwe  village Kashombe
  Babondo  village Kibombo
  Babugu  village Kabimba
  Babulwa  village Kabimba
  Babumba  villages Bumba and Kamba
  Babunda  villages and Kabunda Kabindula
  Bafumu  villages Kasenga Kilomoni and Kanvira
  Bafunda  village Kimanga
  Bagaja  villages Uvira Centre and Mujaga
  Baganda  village Lugongo
  Bagela  village Kabimba
  Bagendo  village Katala
  Bagezi  village Kabimba
  Bagotwe  village Kigongo
  Bagungu  villages and Kanvira Kilomoni
  Bahagwe  village Kigongo
  Bahala  village Makobola
  Bahalu  villages and Makobola Natutwa
  Bahang  village Gomba
  Bahinga , their former name Balama, villages Kabimba Lugongo and Ngaja
  Bahonga  village Kigongo
  Bahofu  village Kabimba
  Bajombo  villages and Bijombo Kitundu
  Bajumbi  villages Kitundu, Kiku and Mbigo
  Bakali  village Kabimba
  Bakanga  villages and Mugea Lugongo
  Bakono  villages Uvira Centre, Kirungu, Kayaja and Makobola . They have no connection with Bakono of Rwanda, the latter being Nilotic while Bakono Uvira are like all other Bantu Bajoba
  Balambo  villages Kigongo, Kihala, Kitundu, Katala and Bugizi
  Baheta village Muheta, Katongo 
  Balega  village Muheta
  Balembwe  villages and Rugembe Kalundu
  Balibu  village Katongo
  Balila  village Kabimba
 ' Balizi'  village Kitundu
  Balingi  village Kigongo
 (a large part of the population was decimated by the floods of the river Kakumba in 1910)
  Balunguti  village Kigongo
  Bangala  (or Bahangala ), villages and Makobola Kabone
  Banone  villages and Kabimba Kitala
  Bashambi  ( not to be confused with Bashimbi which are Bafuliru ), villages and Kala Kalundu
  Basinga  village Kasinga
  Basingwe  village Musingwe
  Batanga  village Kasenga
  Batala  village Kitala
  Batende  village Kabimba
  Batimbu  villages and Kilibula Ruzozi ( Kalundu port)
  Bavumi  village Kishembwe
  Baziba  villages and Kifuta Kagozi
  Bakabaga  villages and Kabimba Kigongo
  BeneLenghe  ( sub-clan of the ancient Balabwe strain) villages Lugongo, Katala and Kala
  Balabwe  (clan that gave birth to BeneLenghe ) village Labwe.

About the Balabwe clan
The case of Balabwe deserves explanation. Because there is the Balabwe the ancient strain and Balabwe the recent strain. The history of the Balabwe ancient strain is very long. It starts with the great king of kingdom theocratic of Bupemba known name Ilunga Kiluwe, also known in the name of Sango Wa Mpemba. This is the one that gave birth to the emperors of the second dynasty of the Luba Empire by his son, Prince Mdidi Kiluwe as tradition often recognized the name  hunter.

This great king Bupemba (territory was transformed into Upemba National Park by the colonizers Belgium) was from the clan of Balabwe term meaning those who have received the anointing of God to reign. Mbidi his son, he also had descendants who continued to rule the kingdom of Bupemba, whose last king Mbuti Ilunga will be forced, because of the cruelty of his brothers emperors Empire Baluba it made war to flee his country Bupemba with his people. The decades that followed, some of his people adopt the name of Bavira when it is reflected both in the current country that give the name of Uvira, saying countries Bavira. < Br/>

In terms of the Balabwe recent strain she began in 1840 by Prince Namango brother of King Muluta 2. The king, having adopted the Muslim religion, he lent strong hands to Arab slave to slavery in his country and in neighboring countries at the time. He also had disputes with its big brother the king about slavery. He was fiercely opposed to the king to have a covenant with the Arabs in the trade of human beings. The King refused to give up its alliances with Arabas, whereupon her little brothers decided to opt out of his clan BeneLenghe Balabwe to return to the old clan of his ancestor.

After this fight, in 1840, left Namango Katala up and move to another land that the people giving the name of Muhungu, that is to say, a place of refuge. These Balabwe of recent strain BeneLenghe share with the country of Katala, height Rugenge (Kanvinvira). The village Rutemba them also belongs. Muhungu of his son Mushaba Mbuti "Mulyama" from base to another location in the city Kitija, which today is in the Chiefdom of Bafuliru.

There's still traces its banana plantation, called "Kigundu kya Mulyama" (the banana plantation of Mulyama). This name Mulyama (who drinks until morning) was given to him in connection with his inclinations exaggerated consumption of the drink. When he landed in a village, he could not proceed without having finished all the drink that it contained two glasses at his own expense, all the villagers. Mulyama built several other cities in this part of the country including Katala (near Namirye) Mujaga (around Lemera) Ndegu (Katobo), etc. where he was installing his brothers Balabwe.
 
In the land of Katala, areas likely descendants of Namango include: Shora and Rutemba. But, most of their fields lie in what is today the Chiefdom of Bufuliru, as we have just seen. And in the Rusizi Plain Chiefdom, there is the whole country Kagando and Kagozi. Luhindiza's son Mushaba Mbuti Mulyama, refused to live in the cities which his father had founded, whose popular culture was essentially based on drunkenness unabated. He still lived with his grandfather in the land of Namango Muhungu. Then he returned to Katala their city of origin. Time after it based very close to Katala, his own city named Rutemba.

Note on Bahinga or Balama. Their original name Balama was given to them by other members of the tribe that the clan members lived a long time before dying. They were the praetorian guard of the king of Bavira since the flight of the people of the Luba empire . And later, when Mubila Munanila (Munana), son of King Ilungha Lenghe first moved the capital of Sanga ( current Nundu ) to Lugongo on the mountain that bears his name (Mt. Munanira overlooking the town of Uvira), the balama also moved to his side, in the same city as him. But then they got into the habit of going down the mountain to beg fry among clans fishermen settled on the shores of lake from Kilomoni up Kilibula: Bafumu, Bafunda, Bagaja, Bagungu, Balizi, Bakono, Balembwe, Batanga, Batimbu etc.

Additions based on ethnographic field data of 1949-50 gathered by Daniel Biebuyck:

Bibliography
 How I Found Livingstone: Travels, Adventures and Discoveries in Central Africa: Including an Account of Four Months' Residence with Dr. Livingstone, London, Sampson Low, 1872 
 G. Weis, Le pays d'Uvira: Étude de géographie régionale sur la bordure occidentale du lac Tanganika, Bruxelles, J. Duculot, 1959
 KALOLERO Bernard (Abbé), Monographie des Bavira: Du Kolo Ilunga Lenghe 1er (1650) au Kolo Lenghe III Rugaza Kabale Rampan Romain Ghislain (Octobre 1996), (inédit), Uvira, 2001
 Nabuvira Njangamwita Kibego, Livre d’Or des Bavira: Au centre de la gloire passée de l’Empire Baluba; L’Ethnohistoire des peuples d’Upemba et d’Uvira revue et corrigée, (inédit), Ottawa, 2013
 Muchukiwa, Description du Territoire ethnique des Bavira''
 Zanzibar au Lac Tanganika''', Bruxelles, P. Maes, 1886

Ethnic groups in the Democratic Republic of the Congo